Claudius Terentianus was an Egyptian enrolled in the Roman army. He was the author of a number of papyrus-letters, mostly addressed to his father  Claudius Tiberianus, a veteran settled in Karanis.

Military service 
 
Claudius Terentianus enlisted in the classis Alexandriae (Alexandrian fleet) sometime around 110 AD. He complained about life in the fleet, and subsequently transferred to a legion. He was deployed to Syria, possibly in relation to Trajan's Parthian campaign, and was wounded quelling civic unrest in Alexandria. He was discharged in 136 AD, and likely settled in the village of Karanis.

Family 

Claudius Terentianus repeatedly refers to Claudius Tiberianus as his father. While a few scholars think this may be an honorary title, most believe that Terentianus is Tiberianus' biological son (both do share the same nomen). Terentianus also calls another man named Ptolemaios "father" (P Mich 5393); this is likely an honorary designator, although Ptolemaios may be his uncle by marriage. Terentianus also refers to a woman he calls his "mother" living in Alexandria, who is most likely his aunt Tabetheus.  If she is the same woman who addresses Claudius Tiberianus as "brother" in P. Mich 5403, then she was living in Alexandria near where Terentianus was stationed. The same letter mentions that Terentianus had a brother named Isidoros and a sister named Segathis, who are being cared for by the aunt in Alexandria. It may be that Tiberianus was a widower, and entrusted his children to his sister in Alexandria while he was occupied with his own military career.

Letter highlights 
P Michigan 5390: Results of a shopping spree in Alexandria; request for new boots.
P Michigan 5391: Terentianus recounts his enlistment in the fleet, and requests military equipment.
P Michigan 5393: Dispute with Ptolemaios, his "father," addressed to Claudius Terentianus, his father.
P Michigan 5400: A Riot in Alexandria, Terentianus is wounded. Possibly connected to the diaspora revolt of 115-117 AD.

References

Adams, J. N. The Vulgar Latin of the Letters of Claudius Terentianus. (P. Mich. VIII 467-72. Manchester, 1977.
 Lewis, N. "A Veteran in Quest of  a Home." Transactions and Proceedings of the American Philological Association. 90 (1959) pp. 139–146.
 Strassi, S. "L'archivio di Claudius Tiberianus da Karanis," Archiv für Papyrusforschung und verwandte Gebiete. Beiheft: 26, Berlin, 2008.
 Taylor, Michael J. "The Papyrus Letters of Claudius Terentianus: A Voice from Egypt." Ancient Warfare Magazine, V.5, 2011.

Year of birth missing
Year of death missing
Ancient Roman soldiers
Romans from Africa
2nd-century Egyptian people
2nd-century writers
Ancient Roman writers
Ancient letter writers
Claudii